An Evening at Charlie's is a 1983 live album by the American jazz singer Mel Tormé, accompanied by George Shearing.

Track listing
1. "Just One of Those Things"/"On Green Dolphin Street" (Cole Porter), (Bronislaw Kaper, Ned Washington) 6:42
2. "Dream Dancing" (Porter) 3:11
3. "Dream Dancing" 3:36
4. "I'm Hip" (Bob Dorough, Dave Frishberg) 3:33
5. "Then I'll Be Tired of You" (Arthur Schwartz) 4:41
6. "Caught in the Middle of My Years"/"Welcome to the Club" (Mel Tormé, George Shearing) 6:02
7. "Nica's Dream" (Horace Silver) 6:32
8. "Chase Me Charlie" (Noël Coward) 4:04
9. "Love Is Just Around the Corner" (Lewis Gensler, Leo Robin) 2:48

Personnel 
 Mel Tormé – vocals
 George Shearing – piano
 Don Thompson – double bass
 Donny Osbourne – drums

References

Mel Tormé live albums
George Shearing live albums
1983 live albums
Albums produced by Carl Jefferson
Concord Records live albums